Sylvain Huet (born 20 October 1960) is a Canadian water polo player. He competed in the men's tournament at the 1984 Summer Olympics.

References

External links
 

1960 births
Living people
Canadian male water polo players
Olympic water polo players of Canada
Water polo players at the 1984 Summer Olympics
Water polo players from Montreal